The Platinum Corridor is a neighborhood and office submarket in the Dallas, Texas (USA) area. It runs through the cities of Dallas, Farmers Branch, Addison, Plano, and Frisco.

Attractions 
 Galleria Dallas in north Dallas
 Addison Circle in Addison
 The Shops at Willow Bend in Plano
 Legacy West in Plano
 The Shops at Legacy in Plano
 Legacy Town Center in Plano
 Stonebriar Centre in Frisco
 Dr Pepper Ballpark in Frisco
 Toyota Stadium in Frisco

References
Garrison, Trey.  "Plotting 'Platinum Corridor'."  Dallas Business Journal.  March 28, 1997.

Further reading
Perez, Christine.  Luster hasn't dulled on Platinum Corridor.  Dallas Business Journal.  Oct. 20, 2000.